The 1951 Australian Championships was a tennis tournament that took place on outdoor Grass courts at the White City Tennis Club, Sydney, Australia from 20 January to 31 January. It was the 39th edition of the Australian Championships (now known as the Australian Open), the 11th held in Sydney, and the first Grand Slam tournament of the year. The singles titles were won by American Dick Savitt and Australian Nancye Wynne Bolton.

Finals

Men's singles

 Dick Savitt defeated  Ken McGregor  6–3, 2–6, 6–3, 6–1

Women's singles

 Nancye Wynne Bolton defeated  Thelma Coyne Long  6–1, 7–5

Men's doubles
 Ken McGregor /  Frank Sedgman defeated  John Bromwich /  Adrian Quist 11–9, 2–6, 6–3, 4–6, 6–3

Women's doubles
 Thelma Coyne Long /  Nancye Wynne Bolton  defeated  Joyce Fitch /  Mary Bevis Hawton 6–2, 6–1

Mixed doubles
 Thelma Coyne Long /  George Worthington defeated  Clare Proctor /  Jack May 6–4, 6–3

References

External links
 Australian Open official website

1951
1951 in Australian tennis
January 1951 sports events in Australia